Fireman Sam is a Welsh animated children's television series about a fireman named Sam, his fellow firefighters, and other residents in the fictional Welsh rural village of Pontypandy (a portmanteau of two real towns, Pontypridd and Tonypandy). The original idea for the show came from two ex-firemen from London, England, who took their idea to artist and writer Rob Lee who developed the concept, and the show was commissioned.

History and development

Fireman Sam first appeared on S4C on 1 November 1987, and a few weeks later on BBC1 on 17 November. The original series finished in 1994, and a new series that expanded the character cast commenced in 2003. The series was sold to over 40 countries and has been used across the United Kingdom to promote fire safety.

The theme song was performed by Mal Pope in a classic rock style from 1987 to 1994, then by a different singer, Cameron Stewart, in a 2000s alternative rock style since the 2003 new episode broadcasts.

The original idea came about from two ex-firemen from London, England – Dave Gingell and David Jones after purchasing a stop motion animation book by artist Anthony Miller. They approached Mike Young, creator of SuperTed, in Barry, Wales, and asked him to further develop their concept. The idea was then brought to S4C's Director of Animation, Chris Grace, who had previously commissioned SuperTed, saw potential in the idea and commissioned the series. The characters and the storylines were created by Rob Lee, an illustrator from Cardiff, and the programme was made using stop motion. It could take up to four days to produce one minute of this form of puppet animation. Fireman Sam has to this day been translated into over 25 different languages including Mandarin.

In the original series, all the character voices were performed by John Alderton. The later series used several actors' voices.

Episodes

Characters

Spin-offs
In 1996, there was a stage show which was later released on video, titled Fireman Sam in Action. It was interspersed with scenes of children learning about fire safety with Gary Lewis, the actor playing Fireman Sam in the stage show.

In 2009, Fireman Sam appeared with other animated children's TV characters in a Children in Need single. The single was put together by Peter Kay.

Fireman Sam was adapted into a live musical theatre show, which began touring the UK in June 2011.

In 2014, Amazon Prime redubbed Fireman Sam using American voices instead of British voices for children in the US. However, the characters of Tom Thomas, Moose Roberts and Bella Lasagna have their regular, respective Australian, Canadian and Italian voices (instead of their being dubbed them with a US voice actor) due to their accents. This cast includes the voices of Andrew Hodwitz, Jonah Ain, Chris D'Silva, Margaret Brock, Lily Cassano, Dave Pender Crichton, Jacob James, Scott Lancastle, Ashley Magwood, Michael Pongracz, Becky E. Shrimpton, Sarah Lynn Strange, Carter Treneer, Mark Ricci, Joe Marth (later replaced by Dave MacRae), Adam Turgeon and Christa Clahane. Starting from season 12, the US dub has been possibly discontinued.

Reception
The ABC website said of the series, "All the characters blend together into an appealing mixture of fun and entertainment for children everywhere."

Common Sense Media recommended the 2005 series for ages three and up, praising it for showing how to "stay calm in a crisis" and rely on a team to solve problems. The American website found that the "distinctly Welsh characters, community, accents, and expressions may pose some minor comprehension problems for kids on this side of the pond", but considered it a useful example of life in another part of the world.

Controversies

In July 2016, it emerged that in Series 9, Episode 6 called "Troubled Waters" – in which the character Elvis slips on a piece of paper and falls into a stack of sheets of paper, causing them to fly everywhere – one of the flying pages that briefly came into view was identified as a page from the Quran: "Surah Mulk (67), verses 13–26". The production company Mattel apologised for this accident, removed the episode from broadcast, and ceased work with Xing Xing, the animation company responsible for the error. Mattel stated: "Someone from the production company thought they were just putting in random text. We have no reason to believe it was done maliciously." It was at first thought that this episode would have to be removed from broadcast circulation, but instead was censored by having the scene edited to show Elvis just slipping on a blank piece of paper, so the television networks were still able to broadcast it. The BBC received more than 1,000 complaints and forwarded them to Channel 5 as the BBC has not aired Fireman Sam since 2008.

In October 2017, the London Fire Commissioner Dany Cotton highlighted Fireman Sam in a campaign fighting sexism and promoting the gender-neutral term . She proposed that Fireman Sam should be renamed "Firefighter Sam", and said that research showed that women are put off a career in the fire service because it is seen as a job for men.

Notes

References

External links

 
 Official Fireman Sam website
 

 
Television characters introduced in 1987
1987 British television series debuts
1980s British children's television series
1990s British children's television series
2000s British children's television series
2010s British children's television series
2020s British children's television series
1980s British animated television series
1990s British animated television series
2000s British animated television series
2000s preschool education television series
2010s British animated television series
2020s British animated television series
British computer-animated television series
British stop-motion animated television series
British television shows featuring puppetry
English-language television shows
BBC children's television shows
Disaster television series
S4C original programming
Fictional firefighters
Television series about firefighting
Television series by DHX Media
Television series by Mattel Creations
Television shows set in Wales
CBeebies
HIT Entertainment
Cartoonito original programming
Channel 5 (British TV channel) original programming
British television series revived after cancellation